The women's high jump at the 2022 Commonwealth Games, as part of the athletics programme, took place in the Alexander Stadium on 4 and 6 August 2022.

Records
Prior to this competition, the existing world and Games records were as follows:

Schedule
The schedule was as follows:

All times are British Summer Time (UTC+1)

Results

Qualification
Qualification: 1.90 (Q) or 12 best performers (q) advance to the Final. .

Final
The medals were determined in the final.

References

Women's high jump
2022
2022 in women's athletics